Rabeya, also known by its English title, The Sister, is a 2008 Bangladeshi Bengali-language war film written and directed by Tanvir Mokammel, with permit from the Government of Bangladesh. The film is set during the Bangladesh Liberation War in 1971, and stars Aly Zaker, Bonna Mirza, Jyotika Jyoti, and Tauquir Ahmed in lead roles. According to Mokammel, Rabeya is a "deconstruction" of the Sophocles play, Antigone, and was premiered on December 6, 2008. 

The film was shot in Khulna and Bagerhat, and was screened at the Singapore International Film Festival and in Copenhagen. It was also broadcast on television in ATN Bangla on December 13, 2008.

Plot 
Two orphaned sisters, Rabeya (Bonna Mirza) and Rokeya (Jyotika Jyoti), live with their uncle, Emdad Kazi (Aly Zaker), who is a conservative Muslim League leader supporting the Pakistan Army, in the village of Ibrahimpur located by the Rupsa River in the Ganges Delta, where a Pakistani army captain stationed a military base. Emdad wants one of his nieces, Rabeya, to be married to his son, Tariqul. Kazi's nephew, Khaled, joins the Mukti Bahini to fight for Bangladesh's independence, but was shot dead by the Pakistan Army during a battle, and was let alone unburied by the river, and no one was allowed to be near the corpse. The Pakistan Army warned to not bury any guerrilla fighter, branded as an 'Indian agent' or 'traitor', and anyone doing so will be executed. Rabeya attempted to bury her brother, but while doing so, she runs away from the spot after almost being noticed by the razakars. Later, she tries to bury her brother again, but was caught and later spared. Rabeya was later taken to her uncle, who told her that burying someone is not a duty of a woman. One night, she goes alone and attempts to continue burying her brother, but was caught by the Pakistan Army and was shot dead. The Bengali guerrilla fighters declare Rabeya as a martyr, and inspire the poor peasants to stand against the army for an independent Bangladesh.

Cast 
 Aly Zaker as Emdad Kazi - A conservative chairman of the village of Ibrahimpur.
 Bonna Mirza as Rabeya - A courageous sister who attempted to bury her brother, Khaled, but was shot dead at the spot.
 Tauquir Ahmed as the intellectually challenged son of Kazi.
 Arman Parvez Murad as Tariqul - Rabeya's fiancé.
 Jyotika Jyoti as Rokeya - Rabeya's sister.
 Masum Aziz as a soldier of the Pakistan Army
 Uttam Guho
 Chitralekha Guho
 Abul Hayat as the father of the sisters, possibly, in a cameo appearance.

References 

2008 films
Bengali-language Bangladeshi films
Films directed by Tanvir Mokammel
Films based on the Bangladesh Liberation War
Guerrilla warfare in film